The 2015 Scottish Cup Final was the 130th final of the Scottish Cup, the most prestigious knockout football competition in Scotland. The match took place at Hampden Park on 30 May 2015 and was contested by Falkirk and Inverness Caledonian Thistle.  Ten-man Inverness won the final 2–1 thanks to a late James Vincent goal.
		
Inverness subsequently entered the 2015–16 UEFA Europa League in the Second qualifying round.  As Inverness also finished 3rd in the 2014–15 Scottish Premiership, this enabled St Johnstone to claim the final 2015–16 UEFA Europa League slot.

Background
This was Falkirk's fifth Scottish Cup Final, having previously won twice (1913 against Raith Rovers and 1957 against Kilmarnock) and lost twice (1997 against Kilmarnock and 2009 against Rangers). It was Inverness' first appearance in the final, their best performances being reaching the semi-final in 2003 and 2004, losing to Dundee and Dunfermline Athletic respectively.

Route to the final

Falkirk

Falkirk, of the Scottish Championship, entered the competition in the Fourth Round. They began their campaign against Cowdenbeath at the Falkirk Stadium. Craig Sibbald scored the goal that sealed the Bairns' passage into the next round. They then took on Brechin City, winning 2–1, courtesy of goals from David McCracken and David Smith.

In the quarter-final Falkirk were drawn against Queen of the South. Craig Sibbald's goal sealed a 1–0 victory. In the semi-final at Hampden Park on 18 April, Falkirk faced Hibernian. A late header from Craig Sibbald sent Falkirk to their first Scottish Cup final since 2009.

Inverness Caledonian Thistle

Inverness, of the Scottish Premiership also entered the competition in the Fourth Round, coming from a goal down away at St Mirren to earn a replay which was comfortably won 4–0.  In the Fifth Round, Caley eased their way past another Premiership side in Partick Thistle at Firhill, winning 2–1 to earn a berth in the quarter-finals.  On this occasion they were given a home tie against Championship club Raith Rovers, who were dispatched by a single goal at the Caledonian Stadium.

This set up a semi-final with favourites Celtic at Hampden Park.  Despite going into the tie as underdogs and falling behind to an early strike by Virgil van Dijk, Inverness stunned the Hoops by winning 3–2 after extra-time courtesy of a late David Raven goal to book their place in the final for the first time.

Pre-match
The match was shown live on BBC Scotland and on Sky Sports.

Match

Summary
Inverness took the lead in the 38th minute when Marley Watkins ran onto an Aaron Doran pass to round goalkeeper Jamie MacDonald and slot low into the net. Carl Tremarco was sent off for Inverness in the 75th minute for bringing down Blair Alston as the last man. Falkirk leveled the game with ten minutes to go when Peter Grant headed to the net at the back post after a free-kick by Blair Alston on the left of the penalty area. With four minutes to go Inverness got the winning goal when James Vincent finished from six yards out after the goalkeeper had parried out a low shot from Marley Watkins.

Details

Match rules
 90 minutes
 30 minutes of extra time if necessary
 Penalty shoot-out if scores still level
 Seven named substitutes
 Maximum of three substitutions

References

2015
1
Falkirk F.C. matches
2010s in Glasgow
Inverness Caledonian Thistle F.C. matches
Sports competitions in Glasgow
May 2015 sports events in the United Kingdom